Qazaniya Sport Club is an Iraqi football team based in Balad Ruz, Diyala, that plays in Iraq Division Two.

Managerial history

  Bassim Hussein
  Ali Abdullah

See also 
 2020–21 Iraq FA Cup
 2021–22 Iraq FA Cup

References

External links
 Qazaniya SC on Goalzz.com
 Iraq Clubs- Foundation Dates

Football clubs in Iraq
2004 establishments in Iraq
Association football clubs established in 2004
Football clubs in Diyala